There have been two baronetcies created for persons with the surname Howe, both in the Baronetage of England and both extinct.

 Howe baronets of Cold Barwick (1660)
 Howe baronets of Compton (1660)

Set index articles on titles of nobility